The 1961–62 Scottish Inter-District Championship was a rugby union competition for Scotland's district teams.

This season saw the ninth formal Scottish Inter-District Championship.

Edinburgh District and South shared the competition with two wins and a draw.

1961–62 League Table

Results

Round 1

South: 

Glasgow District:

Round 2

North and Midlands: 

South of Scotland District:

Round 3

 Edinburgh District: 

North and Midlands:

Round 4

Glasgow District: 

Edinburgh District:

Round 5

 South:

 Edinburgh District:

Round 6

North and Midlands:

 Glasgow District:

Matches outwith the Championship

Other Scottish matches

Glasgow District: 

Ayrshire and Renfrewshire: 

Rest of the West: 

Glasgow District: 

Midlands District: 

North of Scotland District:

Junior matches

West: 

East: 

Glasgow District: 

South of Scotland District: 

Midlands District: 

South of Scotland District: 

Glasgow District: 

Ulster: 

 Edinburgh District: 

Midlands District:

Trial matches

Blues Trial: 

Whites Trial: 

Probables: 

Possibles:

English matches

Northumberland: 

Edinburgh District: 

Scottish Border Club: 

Durham County: 

North of England:

 Scottish Border Club:

International matches

None.

References

1961–62 in Scottish rugby union
Scottish Inter-District Championship seasons